Franklin is an unincorporated community in Monroe County, Alabama, United States.

Geography

References

Unincorporated communities in Alabama
Unincorporated communities in Monroe County, Alabama